KEVN-LD (channel 7) is a low-power television station in Rapid City, South Dakota, United States, affiliated with the Fox network. It is owned by Gray Television alongside ABC affiliate KOTA-TV (channel 3) and MeTV affiliate KHME (channel 23). The stations share studios on Skyline Drive in Rapid City, where KEVN-LD's transmitter is also located.

KEVN is also carried on two of KOTA's full-power satellites: KHSD-TV (channel 11.2) in Lead, South Dakota (which can also be seen over the air in Rapid City), and KSGW-TV (channel 12.2) in Sheridan, Wyoming. KHSD's transmitter is located on Terry Peak near Spearfish, South Dakota, while KSGW's transmitter is on Bosin Rock.

History

KEVN intellectual unit

Until 2016, the KEVN call sign, Fox affiliation, and virtual channel 7 assignment were used on the broadcast license presently associated with KOTA-TV. KEVN-TV had launched in 1976 as an ABC affiliate, replacing KRSD-TV, which had signed on in 1958 as an NBC affiliate with a secondary ABC affiliation, switched to CBS in 1970, and was denied license renewal in 1971; KRSD shut down several months before KEVN began operations. KEVN switched to NBC in 1984 and Fox in 1996. The original KEVN was also seen on a satellite station in Lead, KIVV-TV (channel 5), which operated on the license now used by KHSD-TV; virtual channel 5 is presently used by KQME, a satellite of MeTV affiliate KHME (channel 23).

Current license
On September 14, 2015, Gray bought the non-license assets of the market's ABC affiliate KOTA-TV as part of its acquisition of Schurz Communications' television stations. Due to Federal Communications Commission (FCC) ownership restrictions, Gray established this new low-powered station to move the Fox affiliation, KEVN's call sign, virtual channel, and programming. KOTA's ABC affiliation and program streams including its existing PSIP channel 3 numbering was then moved to the old full-powered KEVN, transmitting on RF channel 7. The original KOTA-TV license was then sold to Legacy Broadcasting and became KHME.

Subchannels
The station's digital signal is multiplexed:

News operation

KEVN-LD broadcasts 9½ hours of locally produced newscasts each week (with 1½ hours each weekday and one hour each on Saturdays and Sundays). The station carries a 6:00 p.m. newscast, but does not produce any newscasts during morning or midday timeslots. It rebroadcasts its hour-long 9:00 p.m. news program at 6:00 a.m. on weekday mornings.

Early in KEVN's Fox affiliation (on what is now KOTA-TV), the station produced an hour-long morning newscast at 7 a.m. and half-hour newscasts at noon, 5:30 p.m., and 10 p.m.; on weekends, KEVN aired only its late newscast. In 1998, the station moved the late newscast to 9 p.m., making it the first Rapid City station to produce a primetime newscast; Around the same time, the morning and midday newscasts were discontinued. By 2001, KEVN expanded the weeknight 9 p.m. news to an hour; the weekend edition of the newscast was expanded to an hour on November 2, 2013. The station moved the early evening newscast to 6 p.m. on March 31, 2008 and relaunched it as The Six.

References

External links
Official website

Fox network affiliates
Television channels and stations established in 2016
2016 establishments in South Dakota
EVN-LD
Gray Television